Maeve Gilroy is a former camogie player, winner of the Cuchulainn award in 1966 and of All Ireland medals in 1956 and 1967.

Career
Gilroy was already regarded as one of the country’s best players when she scored two goals for Antrim against Dublin in the historic 1956 All Ireland semi-final, a match that prevented Dublin winning 19 All Ireland titles in a row. She was goalscorer and lead forward on the first ever Queen's University Belfast team to defeat UCD, by a score of 3-1 to 3-0 in the Ashbourne Cup of 1959, but the cup went to UCD at the end of the round-robin series. When the competition reverted to knock-out in 1961, she was on the QUB team that beat UCC 7-2 to 2-1 at Cherryvale in the Ashbourne Cup semi-final, alongside Margaret Treacy, Eileen Maguire and Maire O’Kane.

Playing in defence through the second half of her career, she was playmaker for the team that defeated Dublin in a 1967 replay and for the Ulster team that won their first Gael Linn Cup in 1967. She continued to play until Antrim’s defeat in the All Ireland final of 1969.

Coach and referee
She coached the Queens' University Ashbourne Cup teams in the 1960s and refereed matches up to All Ireland level, taking charge of the All Ireland finals of 1961 and 1962.

References

Living people
Antrim camogie players
Camogie referees
Queen's University Belfast camogie players
Year of birth missing (living people)
Women referees and umpires